"An Empty Dream" is a song by the Finnish soprano Tarja Turunen, taken as the first single from her EP The Brightest Void, even though it was originally a part of the soundtrack of the 2015 Argentinian horror film Corazón Muerto directed by Mariano Cattaneo. The song was released in a digital format on June 23, 2017, more than a year after the release of The Brightest Void.

Recording locations
The song was recorded at Estudio El Pie, Argentina; Stardust II, Antigua & Barbuda; Sardust, Finland; Genelec Artist Room, Finland; and several other locations in the world.

Video
On the day of the release of the single, the music video of the song was released on the YouTube channel of the earMUSIC. The videoclip was filmed in Buenos Aires, in the same location where the film Corazon Muerto was shot (an old abandoned factory), and features the participation of the main actress of the film, Ariadna Asturzzi. The video alternates pieces taken from the film and scenes shot from scratch in which Tarja and Ariadna Asturzzi act together.

Track listing

References

External links

Tarja Turunen songs
2017 songs
2017 singles
Songs written by Tarja Turunen